For information on all Lamar University sports, see Lamar Cardinals and Lady Cardinals

The 2016–17 Lamar Lady Cardinals basketball team represented Lamar University during the 2016–17 NCAA Division I women's basketball season. The Lady Cardinals, led by fourth year head coach Robin Harmony, played their home games at the Montagne Center and are members of the Southland Conference. They finished the season with a 21–6, 15–3 Southland play. They lost in the semifinals of the Southland women's tournament to Stephen F. Austin. They were invited to the WBI where they lost to Rice in the first round.

Previous season
The Lady Cardinals finished the 2015-16 season with a 12-19 overall record and a 7-11 conference record.  Qualifying for the conference tournament, the Lady Cardinals won the first game against Houston Baptist and were eliminated by McNeese State.

Two Lady Cardinals were recognized by the Southland Conference at the conclusion of the regular season. Chastadie Barrs was named Southland Conference Defensive Player of the Year. Kiara Desamours was named Southland Conference Freshman of the year.  Both players also received conference honorable mention honors.

Roster

Schedule 

|-
!colspan=12 style=""| Non-Conference schedule

|-
!colspan=12 style="" | Conference schedule

|-
!colspan=12 style=""| 

|-
!colspan=12 style=""|

See also 
2016–17 Lamar Cardinals basketball team

References 

Lamar Lady Cardinals basketball seasons
Lamar
Lamar Lady Cardinals basketball
Lamar Lady Cardinals basketball
Lamar